Eugenio Lauz (born 12 May 1906, date of death unknown) was a Uruguayan sailor. He competed at the 1936 Summer Olympics and the 1952 Summer Olympics.

References

External links
 

1906 births
Year of death missing
Uruguayan male sailors (sport)
Olympic sailors of Uruguay
Sailors at the 1936 Summer Olympics – O-Jolle
Sailors at the 1952 Summer Olympics – Finn
Place of birth missing